Phycocharax rasbora is a small species of freshwater fish in the family Characidae and the only member in its genus. It is endemic to the Brazilian Amazon, where only known from the upper Braço Norte River (Serra do Cachimbo region), a blackwater tributary in the Teles Pires basin, itself a part of the Tapajós basin. A dam has been built on the Braço Norte River and while the species is uncommon downstream, it is very abundant in the reservoir above. Its species name refers to the similarity in color and pattern to Trigonostigma rasboras, unrelated but well-known Asian fish.

References

Characidae
Freshwater fish genera
Monotypic fish genera
Fish described in 2017